Mosiula Mea'alofa "Lofa" Tatupu (born November 15, 1982) is a former American football linebacker who played six seasons in the National Football League (NFL).  He was an assistant linebackers coach with the Seattle Seahawks. He played college football for the University of Southern California (USC).  Tatupu was drafted by the Seattle Seahawks in the second round of the 2005 NFL Draft.

Early years
Tatupu was born in San Diego, California and graduated in 2001 from King Philip Regional High School in Wrentham, Massachusetts, where he played quarterback and linebacker in his junior and senior year. His high school coach was his father Mosi Tatupu, a fullback and special teamer who played for the New England Patriots. As a quarterback, Lofa Tatupu threw for 800 yards and 10 touchdowns and rushed for 450 yards and five touchdowns. As a linebacker, Tatupu made 100 tackles. The Sun Chronicle named Tatupu a local high school All-Star in 1999 and 2000.

College career
Tatupu spent his freshman year of college at the University of Maine before transferring to the University of Southern California, where he majored in sociology and played for the USC Trojans football team.  He wore the number 58, which was later worn by another USC linebacker of Samoan heritage, Rey Maualuga. Tatupu played within the player development program managed by head coach Pete Carroll and assistant head coach for defense and linebacker coach Ken Norton Jr. The USC linebacker system ("USC Linebacker U") has developed many NFL stars, often touted as the most talented linebacker corps in college football.

Tatupu started 25 games during his two years for the Trojans. He finished his USC career with 202 tackles, nine sacks, seven interceptions, three fumble recoveries, three forced fumbles, 18 pass deflections, and one touchdown.  He received first-team All-American honors from Sports Illustrated following the 2004 season.

Professional career

2005 NFL Draft
Tatupu was selected 45th overall in the second round of the 2005 NFL Draft by the Seattle Seahawks. Some teams had him rated lower than the second round. Seahawks general manager Tim Ruskell, who used two fourth-round picks to move up nine spots in the draft to get him, took some criticism for trading up for Tatupu, who was considered slightly undersized and a little slow.  Upon joining the Seahawks, Tatupu became a teammate of Matt Hasselbeck.  Hasselbeck's father Don had been a teammate of Lofa's father Mosi during Mosi's career with the New England Patriots.

Pre-draft measurables

Seattle Seahawks
Tatupu quickly established himself as one of the top defensive players in the league as a rookie in 2005, in which he was named to the Pro Bowl, while leading the NFC Champion Seahawks in tackles, with 104, en route to their first Super Bowl appearance in franchise history. He also had four sacks and three interceptions, returning one for a touchdown in Seattle's 42-0 Monday Night Football victory against the Philadelphia Eagles. On December 2, 2007, he continued his success against the Philadelphia Eagles, intercepting three passes and returning them for a total of 100 yards off of Eagles' quarterback A. J. Feeley.

In Tatupu's first three seasons, he led the Seahawks in tackles. He was voted to the Pro Bowl for the first three years of his NFL career: 2005, 2006 and 2007. In 2007, Tatupu was voted to the All-Pro team by the AP. In 2008, Tatupu was hampered by nagging injuries which resulted in him playing at a lower level than he has in the past, and as a result cost him a chance to play in four consecutive Pro Bowls.

Tatupu emerged as the Seahawks' young and fiery leader on defense, making his teammates more attentive to preparation by watching more game tape and calling defensive signals on the field.

On March 21, 2008, the Seahawks signed Tatupu to a six-year contract extension through the year 2015. The deal was worth $42 million, with $18 million guaranteed alone in the years 2008 to 2010. The contract made Tatupu one of the six highest-paid linebackers in the league. Tatupu responded by stating, "I'm going to end my career with the Seahawks."

On October 19, 2009, during a game versus the Arizona Cardinals, Tatupu tore his left pectoral muscle after a collision with teammate Deon Grant and was ruled out for the rest of the season, a huge loss to the already ailing Seahawks. This was the first major injury of Tatupu's professional career after missing only one game in his first four seasons in the NFL.

After suffering through his worst season in 2009, Tatupu was able to play in every game for the Seahawks in 2010, including their two playoff games. Tatupu was released by Seattle on July 31, 2011, after he and the Seattle Seahawks could not come to an agreement on a re-structured contract.

Atlanta Falcons
On March 10, 2012, Tatupu signed a two-year, $5.75 million contract with the Atlanta Falcons. On July 24, 2012, Tatupu suffered a torn pectoral and would miss the entire 2012 NFL season. The Falcons released him the next day.

NFL statistics

Coaching career
The Seahawks announced on February 9, 2015, that Tatupu would be joining Pete Carroll and new defensive coordinator Kris Richard's staff as assistant linebacker coach.  He resigned from his position two years later.

Personal life
Tatupu is of Samoan descent; he is the son of the late former USC Trojan and New England Patriots fullback Mosi Tatupu, and first cousin of Joe Tuipala former NFL linebacker.  In 2019 he founded his own CBD company called ZoneIn CBD.

References

External links
Seattle Seahawks – bio – Lofa Tatupu

1982 births
American football middle linebackers
Living people
Maine Black Bears football players
National Conference Pro Bowl players
American sportspeople of Samoan descent
Seattle Seahawks players
Atlanta Falcons players
USC Trojans football players
People from Plainville, Massachusetts
Players of American football from San Diego
Players of American football from Massachusetts
Seattle Seahawks coaches
King Philip Regional High School alumni